The 1887 United States Senate election in Massachusetts was held during January 1887. Republican incumbent Henry L. Dawes was re-elected to a third term over opposition from within his own party, led by former Governor John Davis Long.

At the time, Massachusetts elected United States senators by a majority vote of the combined houses of the Massachusetts General Court.

Background

Massachusetts had been a solidly Republican state since the start of the American Civil War. The Senate consisted of 25 Republicans and 14 Democrats, and the House consisted of 158 Republicans, 78 Democrats, and 5 independents.

Candidates

Declared
Henry L. Dawes, incumbent Senator since 1874
John Davis Long, U.S. Representative from Hingham and former Governor of Massachusetts

Declined
George D. Robinson, Governor of Massachusetts since 1884

Campaign
On January 10, Long supporters in the legislature moved for a binding Republican caucus to nominate a single candidate and coalesce the Republican vote. Dawes supporters killed the motion and instead substituted one for a non-binding conference. Without a binding caucus, the candidates would be put to the whole of the legislature, where Dawes could rely on his support among Democrats and independents. 

Some considered the matter to be a conclusive victory for Dawes. However, there was a chance that Long could pick up Democratic votes in the legislature, as he had in 1883.

On January 11, both candidates conducted separate canvasses of the legislature, and each found that they would win by around 75 votes.

On January 17, Democrats caucused and determined to cast their first ballot for Patrick A. Collins, and then to divide between Dawes and Long on subsequent ballots. Supporters of Governor George Robinson also determined to cast their ballots for Dawes after voting for Robinson in early balloting, a major blow to Long.

Balloting

First ballot
On the first ballots, Long was well behind Dawes. However, some of his supporters intentionally cast ballots for George Robinson. No candidate was close to the required majority in either house. It was generally conceded by all but the Long faction that Dawes would be re-elected given his unexpected lead in the House and rumors that Democrats would cast their votes for him tomorrow.

Second ballot
On January 19, Democrats held a legislative conference to determine their action on the second ballot. The legislature met in joint convention to decide the election, rather than meeting as separate houses.

Notes

References

1887
Massachusetts
United States Senate